Eberswalde Hauptbahnhof is historically the most important and now the only remaining station in the city of Eberswalde in the German state of Brandenburg. It was opened in the summer of 1842 outside the then city limits on the Berlin–Szczecin railway. The city fathers of Eberswalde did not want a modern railway in their city, so the station was built three kilometres west of the city centre in a wooded area where the Westend district is today.

Station 
Eberswalde was one of the first cities in Germany to be connected by rail. Seven years after the first German railway line was opened between Nuremberg and Fürth, it was then still unusual for German cities to be connected to the very new railway networks. It soon became clear that the development of the railway line was important for the supply of the city. In the following years the city grew mainly to the west towards the station, whose buildings were designed by F. Neuhaus. In 1867, a wooden bridge was built over the tracks.

On 1 May 1844 the following buildings and facilities were present at Eberswalde station:

entrance building, including four official residences
a two stall engine shed
facility for supplying water and coke to locomotives
carriage and freight sheds
coke and salt shed
stables
restaurant

Eberswalde has been a junction since 1866, when a line to Wriezen was opened; it was extended to Frankfurt (Oder) in 1876/77. The station was extended between 1866 and 1867. In 1873, a roundhouse was built with eight stalls and the old two-stall engine shed was demolished. On 7 January 1878, the repair shop of the Berlin-Stettin Railway Company (now the Deutsche Bahn maintenance depot), was opened. Near the station, a line towards Joachimsthal and Templin was opened in 1898, starting from a junction at the nearby station of Britz on the Berlin–Szczecin line. Between 1906 and 1910, the station was remodelled extensively for the first time. It received several platforms, a pedestrian tunnel, a large lobby and several restaurants. In the following decades Eberswalde was a popular destination for Berliners and the station restaurants were especially well attended.

Because of the construction of the Westend district in 1904, a railway bridge was built in 1910 to replace the old wooden bridge. A trolley bus line (Gleislose Bahn Eberswalde) operated for a few months in 1901. From 1910 to 1940 an electric tramway (Straßenbahn Eberswalde) operated from Eberswalde Marktplatz (market place) to the station forecourt. In 1940 the tramway was converted into a trolley bus line, which is now the oldest existing trolley bus line in Germany.

Until about 2004, Eberswalde Station remained largely in its 1910 state, few improvements had taken place. The station facilities were mostly in a poor condition, so a complete reconstruction was then carried out, which involved moving the tunnel to the north and the platforms to the south. The Eberswalde railway station bridge was demolished and replaced by a new structure. Only the main building of the former station is preserved. An old mechanical destination indicator, which is protected as a monument, has been returned to the platform.

Train services
The station is served by the following service(s):

Intercity-Express services (ICE 28) (Binz -) Stralsund - Eberswalde - Berlin - Leipzig - Jena - Nuremberg - Munich (- Innsbruck)
Intercity services (IC 32) Binz - Stralsund - Eberswalde - Berlin - Hanover - Dortmund - Essen - Duisburg - Düsseldorf - Cologne
Regional services  Stralsund - Greifswald - Pasewalk - Angermünde - Berlin - Ludwigsfelde - Jüterbog - Falkenberg - Elsterwerda
Regional services  Schwedt - Angermünde - Berlin - Ludwigsfelde - Jüterbog - Lutherstadt Wittenberg
Regional services  Berlin - Bernau - Eberswalde - Angermunde - Szczecin
Local services  Airport BER - Berlin - Bernau - Eberswalde
Local services  Eberswalde - Werbig - Frankfurt (Oder)
Local services  Eberswalde - Joachimsthal

References

Footnotes

Sources
 
 

Railway stations in Brandenburg
Eberswalde
Buildings and structures in Barnim
Railway stations in Germany opened in 1842
1842 establishments in Prussia